Pero Stanić (born 21 September 1963) is a former professional volleyball player from Bosnia and Herzegovina who was active in Yugoslavia and Croatia. He played for Modriča, OK Vojvodina, HAOK Mladost, Gran Canaria, Almeria and SG Eltmann. Now he is a coach at OK Napredak Odžak.

References

1963 births
Volleyball coaches
Living people